Daniel or Danny Cox may refer to:
 Danny Cox (baseball), former baseball pitcher
 Danny Cox (ice hockey) (1903–1982), ice hockey forward
 Daniel Cox (bishop) (1931–2021), American Anglican bishop
 Danny Cox (musician) (born 1942), folk rock songwriter and musician
 Danny Cox (cricketer) (born 1992), English cricketer
 Daniel Cox (born 1990), tennis player
 Daniel Allen Cox (born 1976), Canadian author and screenwriter
 Daniel L. Cox, American politician from Maryland
 Daniel Cox (physicist), American physicist

See also
 Daniel Coxe (1640–1730), governor of West Jersey